Businessburg is an unincorporated community in Belmont County, in the U.S. state of Ohio.

History
A post office called Businessburgh was established in 1862, the name was changed to Businessburg in 1894, and the post office closed in 1907. Besides the post office, Businessburg had a mill, built in 1848.

References

Unincorporated communities in Belmont County, Ohio
1862 establishments in Ohio
Unincorporated communities in Ohio